The 2014 Liga Nusantara West Sumatra season is the first edition of Liga Nusantara West Sumatra is a qualifying round of the 2014 Liga Nusantara.

The competition scheduled starts on 5 May 2014.

Teams
This season there are all amateur West Sumatra club participants.

League table

Result

References 

West Sumatra